Nikki Michelle James (born June 3, 1981) is an American actress and singer. James has performed in the popular stage musicals The Book of Mormon and Les Misérables, her role in the former having earned her a Tony Award.

Life and career 
James was born to immigrant parents, a Vincentian father and a Haitian mother who settled in New Jersey in pursuit of the American dream. James grew up in Livingston, New Jersey where she would graduate from Livingston High School. As a child, she sang and acted in church and in school performances. She was nominated for a Rising Star Award at Paper Mill Playhouse for her performance as Dolly Levi in high school. She later attended the Tisch School of the Arts at New York University.

James made her Broadway debut in the ill-fated The Adventures of Tom Sawyer, and starred as Ottilie in the New York City Center Encores! production of House of Flowers. She played Adela in the Off-Broadway run of Michael John LaChiusa's musical adaptation of Bernarda Alba and appeared in the Broadway cast of All Shook Up.

James played Dorothy in the revival of The Wiz at La Jolla Playhouse and also starred in Romeo and Juliet and Caesar and Cleopatra at the Stratford Festival with Christopher Plummer. For her performance as Nabulungi in The Book of Mormon, she won the 2011 Tony Award for Best Featured Actress in a Musical. During that run, she took a leave in June 2012 to film a screen version of Lucky Stiff. From 2014 to January 2015, she played Éponine in the Broadway revival of Les Misérables.

In July 2017, James starred in the New York City Center Encores! staged concert of The Bubbly Black Girl Sheds Her Chameleon Skin.

Filmography

Theatre

Awards and nominations

References

External links
 
 
 

1981 births
American people of Haitian descent
American stage actresses
American voice actresses
Living people
Livingston High School (New Jersey) alumni
People from Livingston, New Jersey
Tisch School of the Arts alumni
Tony Award winners